Gary Eugene Redus (born November 1, 1956) is an American former professional baseball outfielder, who played in Major League Baseball (MLB) for the Cincinnati Reds, Philadelphia Phillies, Chicago White Sox, Pittsburgh Pirates, and Texas Rangers.

Career

High school
Redus, a star at Tanner High School in Alabama, was originally selected by the Boston Red Sox in the 17th round of the 1977 MLB Draft after playing at Calhoun Community College but he did not sign, opting to attend Athens State University. In 1977, he played collegiate summer baseball with the Cotuit Kettleers of the Cape Cod Baseball League.

Professional

Cincinnati Reds

The Cincinnati Reds then drafted him in the 15th round of the 1978 MLB Draft; he signed with the Reds, who sent him to their Pioneer League farm team, the Billings Mustangs in Montana. Redus (who was nearly 21 and thus a few years older than most of the other players in the league) hit for a .462 batting average with 17 home runs and 62 RBI in just 253 at-bats. Redus' average set an all-time American professional baseball record, which still stands.

After working his way through the Reds' minor league system and hitting .333 for the Triple-A Indianapolis Indians in 1982, Redus was recalled in September of that year, staying with Cincinnati through the 1985 season, when he was traded to the Philadelphia Phillies  with Tom Hume to Philadelphia Phillies in exchange for John Denny and Jeff Gray (December 11, 1985).

Philadelphia Phillies

The Phillies traded him to the Chicago White Sox March 26, 1987 in exchange for Joe Cowley and cash.

Chicago White sox
In 1987, that season, Redus finished third in stolen bases in the American League with 52.

Pittsburgh Pirates

Chicago traded Redus to the Pittsburgh Pirates in 1988 in exchange for Mike Diaz.

On August 25, 1989, Redus hit for the cycle for the Pirates in a 12–3 victory over the Reds.

Redus had his best offensive season in 1989, and helped the Pirates to three straight National League East division titles from 1990 to 1992, but his production was hampered by injuries; after 1988, he never appeared in more than 98 games in any regular season. Redus led all batters with a .438 average (7-for-16) through the first six games of the 1992 National League Championship Series, having started four games at first base, and appearing as a pinch hitter once. Pirates manager Jim Leyland opted not to play Redus in the decisive seventh game, favoring left-handed batters against right-handed pitcher John Smoltz of the Atlanta Braves. In the seventh game, the Braves scored three times in the bottom of the ninth to erase a 2–0 Pirates lead and capture the National League pennant.

Texas Rangers

Redus opted for free agency at the end of 1992, playing two injury-plagued seasons with the Texas Rangers before retiring at the end of the 1994 campaign.

Personal life
Redus and his wife have four children; daughters Lakesha, Manisha, and Nakosha, and a son, Gary II. In 2003, Redus was inducted to the sports hall of fame for Limestone County, Alabama. As of 2013, Redus lives in Decatur, Alabama. In 2017, Redus joined the coaching staff of the Montgomery Biscuits, a Double-A farm team for the Tampa Bay Rays. A 1989 news article noted that Redus had been fixing up a 1934 Chevrolet Coupe and a 1935 Ford Sedan over the prior winter. "It's my hobby," he remarked. "I love cars. I really love the old cars, rebuilding them and driving them."

Gary Redus II played basketball at the University of South Alabama and was named an assistant coach for the Louisiana State women's basketball team on April 20, 2022.

See also
 List of Major League Baseball players to hit for the cycle

References

Further reading

External links

Gary Redus at Baseball Gauge

1956 births
Living people
Athens State University alumni
Baseball players from Alabama
Major League Baseball outfielders
Major League Baseball first basemen
African-American baseball players
Cincinnati Reds players
Philadelphia Phillies players
Chicago White Sox players
Pittsburgh Pirates players
Texas Rangers players
Billings Mustangs players
Greensboro Hornets players
Nashville Sounds players
Tampa Tarpons (1957–1987) players
Waterbury Reds players
Indianapolis Indians players
Reading Phillies players
Cotuit Kettleers players
Sportspeople from Decatur, Alabama
Calhoun Warhawks baseball players
21st-century African-American people
20th-century African-American sportspeople